Lloyd "Bronco" Reese (July 17, 1920 – October 28, 1981) was an all-star and Grey Cup champion in the Canadian Football League and a National Football League champion. He was primarily a fullback but also starred on the offensive line.

A graduate of University of Tennessee, Reese joined the Chicago Bears for their 1946 championship season, playing 3 games and rushing 18 times for 84 yards.

In 1948, he joined the Montreal Alouettes where his 251-pound frame made him the biggest fullback in Canadian pro football. Playing a full 12 game season he was selected as an All-Star at guard. In 1949, he played another full sked, helping the Larks to their first ever Grey Cup championship.

Reese died on October 28, 1981 in Dover, Ohio.

References

1920 births
1981 deaths
Montreal Alouettes players
Chicago Bears players
Tennessee Volunteers football players
People from New Philadelphia, Ohio